The white mullet or silver mullet (Mugil curema) is a tropical and subtropical marine fish of the family Mugilidae. It is commonly about 30 cm long.

Note that silver mullet is also a common name used for fantail mullet (Mugil gyrans).

Distribution and habitat
The white mullet is an Atlantic and Pacific fish mainly found on American coasts.
In the Western Atlantic it ranges from Argentina to Cape Cod and rarely even up to Nova Scotia. In the Eastern Atlantic it occurs from Namibia to  Senegal, and in the Eastern Pacific from Chile to the Gulf of California.

The white mullet is found along sandy coasts and in littoral pools, but also occurs in brackish lagoons and estuaries on muddy substrates and sometimes even in rivers. Juveniles in particular invade estuaries and coastal lagoons. Adults occur in schools.

Atlantic USA
In the US, owing to their small size (less than 12 inches), white mullet are primarily used for bait. In some parts of Florida and southern Alabama, they are occasionally eaten in the place of the much larger striped mullet (or flathead mullet) (Mugil cephalus). Adult white and striped mullet consume the mud found on the bottom of estuarine waters, digesting the algae, plankton, and plant and animal detritus therein. These mullet are unique in having a muscular gizzard. They are an important part of the ecologies of estuarine and coastal waters of the Gulf and Atlantic coasts of America.

References

External links
 

white mullet
Fish of the Atlantic Ocean
Western American coastal fauna
Taxa named by Achille Valenciennes
white mullet